Trungboa is a genus of flowering plants belonging to the family Plantaginaceae.

Its native range is Vietnam.

Species:
 Trungboa poilanei (Gagnep.) Rauschert

References

Plantaginaceae
Plantaginaceae genera